Frances Borden (born November 1970) is a British artist known for portraiture, particularly self-portraiture. She has been a prizewinner in the BP Portrait Award at the National Portrait Gallery in London on three occasions.

Biography

Frances Borden was born in Hammersmith, but raised in rural Devon. She is the younger sister of photographer Harry Borden and artist Nicholas Borden. Alongside being an artist, she is a STAT certified teacher of the Alexander technique.

Awards
Wells Art Contemporary Award, First Prize, 2012

Rootstein Hopkins Foundation, Project Grant, 2006

Arts Council England, Grants for the Arts, 2006

The BP Portrait Award, Commendations, 1996 and 2000, and Second Prize, 1998

Hunting Art Prizes, Cornwall Prize, 1999 and Runner Up, Young Artist of the Year, 1997

Black Swan Open Art Competition, First Prize, 1998

NatWest 90s Prize for Art, Second Prize, 1996 and Student Prize 1995

References

External links

1970 births
Living people
British painters
Alumni of the University of the Arts London

20th-century British painters
20th-century English painters
20th-century English women artists
21st-century English painters
21st-century women artists
English contemporary artists
English women painters